Dinas Cromlech or Dinas y Gromlech is a distinctive rhyolite rock outcrop at the Llanberis Pass, in Snowdonia, northwest Wales, which has a distinctive "open book" shape that is clearly visible from the road (A4086), and is very popular for rock climbers, and features in the history of the sport.

Climbing history
The obvious traditional climbing route up the deep ninety-degree angled corner resisted attempts for many years until it was climbed by Joe Brown in 1952, and called Cenotaph Corner (1952, E1 5c, with Doug Belshaw).  The outcrop is an important rock climbing venue in Britain, and the corner includes some of the famous traditional climbing routes in British rock climbing history, including  Cemetery Gates (E1 6c) by Don Whillans in 1951, Left Wall (E2 5c) by Ron Moseley in 1956, Right Wall (E5 6c) by Pete Livesey in 1974, and Lord of the Flies (E6 6a) by Ron Fawcett in 1979. It also includes some of the most intimidating traditional climbs in Britain, such as Steve Mayer's 1992 climb, Nightmayer (E8 6c), from which climbers risk very large falls.

In popular culture
In fiction, the travel writer Eric Newby gives a comic description of his first climb - and almost his only training in mountaineering - at the outcrop, the 'Spiral Stairs’. This is often referred to as Ivy Sepulchre but careful reading of Newby’s vague text will clearly show that this was indeed Spiral Stairs.He was led we are told by two expert waitresses from the inn where he is staying, in his book A Short Walk in the Hindu Kush.

Filmography
 Fawcett FFA of Lord of the Flies (E6 6a):

Bibliography
North Wales Classics (Jack Geldard), 2010, Rockfax. .
North Wales Climbs (Mark Reeves, Jack Geldard, Mark Glaister), 2013, Rockfax. .

See also
Clogwyn Du'r Arddu, a mountain crag in Snowdonia
Dinorwic quarry, a slate climbing area near Llanberis
History of rock climbing

References

External links
Dinas Cromlech, UKClimbing Crag Guide (2022)
Dinas Cromlech, PlanetMountain Crag Guide (2022)

Llanberis
Cliffs of Gwynedd
Cliffs of Snowdonia
Rock formations of Gwynedd
Rock formations of Snowdonia
Climbing areas of Wales